Abandonia is an abandonware website, focusing mainly on showcasing video games and distributing games made for the MS-DOS system.

Abandonia also features a music section and an Abandonware List, a continuously expanded database of over 4600 games including information about their publishers, release dates and whether according to the staff's knowledge the software is sold, protected or abandoned. This list is a sum total of research and inquiries made by the site crew, with sources including MobyGames, Wikipedia and the company registry at Home of the Underdogs.

Reloaded is a sister project of Abandonia, with the focus upon freeware games.

Every game showcased is accompanied by a set of screenshots, and reviews written and proof-read by members.  As non-profit sites, both Abandonia and Reloaded are community-driven projects. With the exception of the featured games themselves, all content available on the sites is created by their community as a volunteer effort.

Both also have a game evaluation system, in which games are rated by a site reviewer and regular visitors.

History
Abandonia was created by Croatian, Kosta Krauth on June 21, 1999.

At that time Abandonia was an oldwarez site, with games such as Monkey Island and Doom available for download, even though these games were still being sold in stores. The site gained a major boost in popularity throughout 2003 and 2004 as a discussion forum was opened, updates became more frequent, and the focus shifted towards abandoned games.

In addition to the site's primary English, Abandonia has to varying extent been translated into a number of other languages - German, Spanish, French, Dutch, Portuguese, Swedish, Italian, Danish, Polish, Croatian, Norwegian, Slovene, Icelandic, Greek, Slovak, Romanian, Hebrew and Russian.

In July 2010, Abandonia was acquired by Abovo Media Group, a Swedish internet media company. Abovo Media Group took over the hosting responsibilities for Abandonia and support of its upcoming versions. Since 2010 the Abovo Media Group team led by Rafiq Ahmed, Andreas Swahn, Steven Harding and Abdul Majid has managed the development, maintenance and support of the site.

Between 2006 and 2010, Abandonia was owned by Studentis Group, a Swedish online community company. Studentis handled the hosting responsibilities for Abandonia and supported its upcoming versions. In October 2007 Abandonia received a new layout and was transferred over to the Drupal platform by Kosta Krauth and the Studentis team consisting of Andreas Swahn, Marcus Johansson, Daniele Testa, Fredrik Holm and Carl McDade.

Data breach
In November 2015, the website's database was breached, allowing attackers to gain information on 776,000 accounts registered on the site. The data contained email and IP addresses, usernames and salted MD5 hashes of passwords. This hack was made public by website Have I Been Pwned? on June 5, 2017.

Another breach has occurred in November 2022 according to Have I Been Pwned, affecting 920,000 accounts.

Software hosted on Abandonia
Abandonia's definition of abandonware is one of the more clearly defined in the abandonware scene. In order for a game to be considered abandoned it has to pass three criteria:
First, the game has to be unavailable on the retail market and no longer distributed by its publishers nor in any format by legitimate retailers.
Second, official support for the game, by both its publisher and developer, must have ended.
Third, the game must not be under active protection of any anti-piracy agency, such as Entertainment Software Association, nor directly by the copyright holders themselves. If a legitimate copyright holder for any game requests its removal - any downloads of the game (or links to thereof) present on the site or its forum will be subject to removal by site staff (although the review of the game will still remain onsite).
Only the PC version of the game needs to fulfill the above three criteria: whether any console versions do or do not is considered irrelevant, as Abandonia follows a strict policy to not deal with ROMs or disk images for non-PC systems.

If the site staff discovers that one of the games placed on the site no longer fulfils one of those criteria or has been qualified as Abandonware when it was not, downloads of the game is removed on Abandonia's own initiative.

In order to facilitate status identification for games not yet introduced in its abandonware list, the staff of Abandonia relies on a list of known ESA member and subsidiary companies, that can be found incorporated in the ruleset of the site's Requests forum.

Reloaded 

Reloaded (previously "Abandonia Reloaded") is a sister project of Abandonia dedicated to the development and distribution of freeware games. It was created on 2005-05-07 by Kosta Krauth, Monica Schoenthaler, Maikel Kersbergen & Tom Henrik Aaberg. 

The site was maintained by small number of volunteer staff, most of whom have been involved with the original Abandonia.

History
The concept for Abandonia Reloaded was conceived by Kosta Krauth, Abandonia's owner, in 2004, in order to separate independently produced freeware from the abandonware already featured on Abandonia. He was joined by Maikel Kersbergen and Tom Henrik, both already admins for Abandonia.  Soon after, Monica Schoenthaler was invited to join the team. These four are listed as the original "Founders" of Abandonia Reloaded.

Its library of games initially consisted of Adventure genre titles, but was later expanded to include other genres, with both old commercial games released as freeware (such as The Elder Scrolls: Arena, The Black Cauldron and Beneath a Steel Sky), and later independent freeware (such as Ark 22, Trilby's Notes and Enclosure).

On October 14, 2010, it was announced that "Abandonia Reloaded" was to be renamed "Reloaded".

Notes

References

External links
 
 Reloaded Abandonia's Sister Project, dealing with remakes and "retro"-style games.
 Abandonia's archive of press and web articles referring to the site

Abandonware websites